Fredius is a genus of crabs in the family Pseudothelphusidae, containing the following species:
Fredius adpressus Rodríguez & Periera, 1992
Fredius beccarii (Coifmann, 1939)
Fredius chaffanjoni (Rathbun, 1905)
Fredius convexa (Rathbun, 1898)
Fredius denticulatus (H. Milne-Edwards, 1853)
Fredius estevisi (Rodríguez, 1966)
Fredius fittkaui (Bott, 1967)
Fredius granulatus Rodríguez & Campos, 1998
Fredius platyacanthus Rodríguez & Pereira, 1992
Fredius reflexifrons (Ortmann, 1897)
Fredius stenolobus Rodríguez & Suárez, 1994
Fredius ykaa Magalhães, 2009

References

Pseudothelphusidae